Freeman House or variations such as Freeman Farm may refer to:

in Nigeria
Freeman House, Lagos

in the United States
(by state then town or city)
Albert Colton and H. H. Freeman House, Florence, Arizona, listed on the National Register of Historic Places (NRHP) in Pinal County
John A. Freeman House, Snowflake, Arizona, listed on the NRHP in Navajo County
Freeman-Felker House, Rogers, Arkansas, listed on the NRHP
Wood Freeman House No. 1, Searcy, Arkansas, listed on the NRHP
Wood Freeman House No. 2, Searcy, Arkansas, listed on the NRHP
Samuel Freeman House in Hollywood, Los Angeles, California, designed by Frank Lloyd Wright.
Mary and Eliza Freeman Houses, Bridgeport, Connecticut, listed on the NRHP in Connecticut
A. C. Freeman House in Punta Gorda, Florida, listed on the NRHP in Florida
Freeman-Hurt House, Oakman, Georgia, listed on the NRHP in Gordon County
Freeman-Brewer-Sawyer House, Hillsboro, Illinois, listed on the NRHP
Clarkson W. Freeman House, Springfield, Illinois, listed on the NRHP
Freeman-Zumbrunn House, Chapman, Kansas, listed on the NRHP in Kansas
Davis-Freeman House, Gloucester, Massachusetts, listed on the NRHP
Cottage-Freeman Historic District, North Attleborough, Massachusetts, listed on the NRHP
Freeman Farm Historic District, Gray, Maine, listed on the NRHP
Reuben Freeman House, Inver Grove Heights, Minnesota, listed on the NRHP
Freeman House (Guilderland, New York), listed on the NRHP in New York
Freeman House (Gates, North Carolina), listed on the NRHP in North Carolina
Joseph Freeman Farm, Gates, North Carolina, listed on the NRHP in North Carolina
Freeman House (Murfreesboro, North Carolina), listed on the NRHP in North Carolina
Lewis Freeman House, Pittsboro, North Carolina, listed on the NRHP in North Carolina
King-Freeman-Speight House, Republican, North Carolina, listed on the NRHP in North Carolina
James W. Freeman House, Wilton, North Carolina, listed on the NRHP in North Carolina
Freeman Farm (Frankston, Texas), listed on the NRHP in Texas
Freeman Plantation House, Jefferson, Texas, listed on the NRHP in Texas
Roscius S. and Lydia R. Freeman House, River Falls, Wisconsin, listed on the NRHP in Wisconsin